News from Nowhere is the second album by the UK electronic music band Darkstar. It was released in February 2013 by Warp Records. The album was produced and recorded at Richard Formby's studio in Leeds, using Formby's vintage analogue synthesizers and classic tape machines.

Darkstar members Aiden Whalley, James Young and new member James Buttery returned from touring to promote their debut album North, and began writing and recording the album in rural Yorkshire. The album is named after William Morris' classic book whose subject matter combined utopian socialism and science fiction.

This album differs from their earlier album North by the addition of vocal work from Buttery.

Reception 
News from Nowhere received positive reviews from MOJO and The Quietus, and generally positive reviews from several other reviewers.

Track listing

References 

2013 albums
Albums produced by Richard Formby
Darkstar (band) albums
Warp (record label) albums